Hudební nástroje (translation: Musical Instruments) was an influential Czechoslovakian quarterly journal for research, development, production, and use of musical instruments.  It was published by the state-owned instrument manufacturer, Československé hudební nástroje, headquartered in Hradec Králové.  It was first published in 1964 (Volume 1, Issue 1).  Its final issue was in 1999 (Volume 36, Issue 2).  Variant names were HMM: Hudební nástroje (beginning 1991) and Musikinstrumente.

Publishers 
 1990–1992: VANN, s.r.o., Hradec Králové (the firm dissolved in 1992)
 VANN is an acronym for Vydavatelství a nakladatelství novinářů (publishing journalists)

References 

1964 establishments in Czechoslovakia
Czech-language magazines
Defunct magazines published in Czechoslovakia
Magazines established in 1964
Magazines disestablished in 1999
Music magazines
Quarterly magazines